Ronald William Boyce (born 6 January 1943) is an English former professional footballer who played his entire career for West Ham United, making 282 Football League appearances for them.

Career
Boyce played for England schoolboys football team and for Essex Schoolboys at cricket. He joined West Ham as an apprentice in 1959 and made his first team debut in a Southern Floodlight Cup game against Millwall on 13 October 1959. His first Football League game was over a year later, on 22 October 1960, in a 5–2 home win against Preston North End. He made a total of 342 appearances for West Ham in all competitions, scoring 29 goals. This included 282 league appearances between 1960 and 1972, in which he scored 21 goals. He also made 22 FA Cup appearances scoring 5 goals, the most important of which was the winner in the 3–2 win over Preston North End in the 1964 FA Cup Final. He was also a member of the 1965 European Cup Winners' Cup winning team on 19 May 1965. His nickname, Ticker, relates to his role as the "heartbeat" of those cup wins. His final two seasons with the club, 1971–72 and 1972–73, saw Boyce restricted to three substitute appearances as he was used as backup for Trevor Brooking, Billy Bonds and Pat Holland. He was awarded a testimonial match against Manchester United, managed by former Hammers player Frank O'Farrell, on 13 November 1972. His final appearance for West Ham came on 30 December 1972 in a 2–1 away defeat to Leicester City.

After retiring as a player, he became a key member of the coaching staff under John Lyall, a period which included the FA Cup Final victories in 1975 against Fulham and against Arsenal in 1980. He subsequently coached under Billy Bonds. Boyce also took charge of West Ham for one game as caretaker manager in February 1990. He was appointed West Ham's chief scout in September 1991, remaining in that position until 1995. He went on to hold coaching roles at Queens Park Rangers and Millwall, before joining Tottenham Hotspur as a scout in 1998.

He was honoured with a Lifetime Achievement Award by West Ham in 2019.

Honours
West Ham
FA Cup: 1963–64
FA Charity Shield: 1964
European Cup Winners' Cup: 1964–65

References

1943 births
Living people
Footballers from East Ham
English footballers
Association football midfielders
West Ham United F.C. players
English Football League players
West Ham United F.C. non-playing staff
West Ham United F.C. managers
Queens Park Rangers F.C. non-playing staff
Millwall F.C. non-playing staff
Tottenham Hotspur F.C. non-playing staff
English football managers
Association football coaches
FA Cup Final players
Association football scouts